St. Lucia's College (commonly known as St. Lucia's or Lucia's) is a Roman Catholic school located in Kotahena area of Colombo, Sri Lanka. This school was founded in 1880 and it is a Government School, managed by Ministry of Education (Sri Lanka), which provides primary and secondary education.

The School Motto both "Pro Deo et Patria" written in Latin phrase and "मेरा देवाय स स्वदेशाय।" (Swa devvaya sa swadeshaaya) written in Sanskrit phrase having same meaning as "For God and Country".

Principals
Jayantha Wickremasinghe

Education
The school has Sinhala and Tamil mediums for Grade 1 to Grade 11 students. Recently the school is planning to start A/L classes.

1880 establishments in Ceylon
Boys' schools in Sri Lanka
Catholic secondary schools in Sri Lanka
Private schools in Sri Lanka
Schools in Colombo